Touched is the debut full-length album by drone doom band Nadja, it was first released in May 2003 by Deserted Factory Records. This album was made when Nadja was still a solo effort of Aidan Baker, prior to when Leah Buckareff joined Nadja in 2005.

The album was re-issued by Alien8 recordings on March 13, 2007, with extended songs (except in the case of 'Stays Demons'), and remastered with an untitled bonus track at the end of "Flowers of Flesh". The digital edition released via Bandcamp, however, considers the untitled track as part of 'Flowers of Flesh'.

Track listing

Original edition

2007 reissue

Personnel

Original edition
Aidan Baker – guitar, bass, vocals, violin, loops

2007 re-issue
Aidan Baker – guitar, vocals, flute, drum machine
Leah Buckareff – bass, vocals

References

External links
2003 edition of "Touched"
2007 edition of "Touched"

2003 debut albums
Alien8 Recordings albums
Nadja (band) albums